Al-Fadl ibn Naubakht, (also written Nowbakht), was an 8th century Persian scholar. He was son of Naubakht, a former Zoroastrian, who had designed the House of Wisdom.

Al-Fadl ibn Naubakht was appointed as a scholar at the court of caliph Harun al-Rashid.

References 

Year of birth missing
8th-century deaths
Medieval Iranian librarians
Medieval Iranian astrologers
Scholars from the Abbasid Caliphate
8th-century Iranian people
8th-century astrologers
8th-century translators
8th-century Arabic writers
8th-century people from the Abbasid Caliphate
8th-century writers